is the 12th single from the Japanese band High and Mighty Color. It is the band's second double-a side single.

Information
The 12th single from the Japanese band, High and Mighty Color. Flashback was used as the second opening theme to TV Tokyo anime Hero Tales while Komorebi no Uta was used as the ending theme to the same anime. Komorebi no Uta began airing on January 6, 2008, while Flashback was used as the second opening theme to the anime later that month. The songs are described on the site as containing both a rock edge and a ballad sound. The single is the lowest selling from the band.

Track list

Charts

Flashback/Komorebi no Uta airplay rankings

References 

High and Mighty Color songs
2008 singles
Anime songs
2008 songs
SME Records singles